Tuřice is a municipality and village in Mladá Boleslav District in the Central Bohemian Region of the Czech Republic. It has about 400 inhabitants.

Administrative parts
The village of Sobětuchy is an administrative part of Tuřice.

Geography
It lies in a flat landscape in the Jizera Table. The municipality is situated on the right bank of the Jizera River, which forms the eastern municipal border.

History
The first written mention of Tuřice is from 1194. Sobětuchy was first mentioned in 1488. From the 14th century until establishment of a sovereign municipality in 1850, the area was part of the Brandýs estate and shared its owners and destiny.

Transport
The D10 motorway passes through the municipality.

Sights
There are no cultural monuments in the municipality.

References

External links

Villages in Mladá Boleslav District